Culleoka may refer to:
Culleoka, Tennessee, an unincorporated community in Maury County, Tennessee
Culleoka, Texas, a populated place in Collin County, Texas